Alfred Hugh Stratford (5 September 1853 – 2 May 1914) was an English sportsman who played first-class cricket for Middlesex and represented the England national football team.

Stratford was at Middlesex from 1877 to 1880, during which time he also played first-class cricket with the Marylebone Cricket Club. A Malvern College graduate, he was a slow right-arm bowler and capable lower order batsman. His best performance came in 1878 when he took 12 wickets for Middlesex against Surrey at Kennington Oval. He collected 6 for 41 in the first innings and 6 for 113 in the second, dismissing England Test opener Harry Jupp in both.

At football, as a defender, Stratford appeared in his only international in a 2–1 loss to Scotland in 1874. He was a member of three FA Cup winning teams, all with the Wanderers and in successive years from 1876 to 1878.

After moving to America, Stratford continued playing cricket, with Winnipeg, Pittsburgh, New York and Newark.

In 1884, four years since his last first-class appearance, Stratford played beside his brother Frederick in a first-class match for the United States of America against the Gentlemen of Philadelphia.

References

1853 births
1914 deaths
American cricketers
English cricketers
Marylebone Cricket Club cricketers
Middlesex cricketers
North v South cricketers
English footballers
England international footballers
Wanderers F.C. players
People educated at Malvern College
Association footballers not categorized by position
London United Eleven cricketers
FA Cup Final players